Institute of Professional Education and Knowledge (PEAK), is a provider of professional training services in Hong Kong. PEAK is a constituent institution of the Vocational Training Council. PEAK was formed in 2003 by the merger of the Financial Services Development Centre, the Information Technology Training and Development Centre, and the Management Development Centre. The Institute offers courses in: financial services, management, information technology, languages, construction, real estate & property management, and food safety.

References

2003 establishments in Hong Kong
Educational institutions established in 2003
Universities and colleges in Hong Kong